Tarush Huachanan (possibly from Ancash Quechua taruka, tarush deer, Quechua wacha birth, to give birth, -na a suffix, "where the deer is born", -n a suffix) is a mountain in the Cordillera Blanca in the Andes of Peru,  high. It is situated in the Ancash Region, Asunción Province, Chacas District, and in the Huari Province, Huari District. Tarush Huachanan lies in the Huascarán National Park, northeast of Perlilla.

References

  

Mountains of Peru
Mountains of Ancash Region
Huascarán National Park